HMS Brantingham was one of 93 ships of the  of inshore minesweepers.

Their names were all chosen from villages ending in -ham. The minesweeper was named after Brantingham in the East Riding of Yorkshire.

In 1958 it was transferred to the Royal Malayan Navy and renamed KD Temasek.

References

Blackman, R.V.B. ed. Jane's Fighting Ships (1953)

 

Ham-class minesweepers
Royal Navy ship names
1953 ships